Alfred Godwin (1850–1934) was an English-born stained-glass artist, who settled in Philadelphia, Pennsylvania.

Career
Godwin received his training in stained-and-leaded glass making in England, and emigrated to the United States in 1874. He opened his own shop in Philadelphia in 1878, and entered into a partnership with Wilhelm Reith – "Alfred Godwin & Company" – in 1883. An 1891 advertisement lists their shop at 1325 Market Street, Philadelphia. He was part of the short-lived "Association of Art Workers" (1893-1895), a team of Philadelphia artisans, furniture-makers and decorators who could collaborate on multiple aspects of a design project. This was similar to Louis Comfort Tiffany's collaboration, "Associated American Artists."

Godwin exhibited four stained glass windows at the 1904 St. Louis World's Fair: Angel of the Annunciation, Virgin Mary, Knights in Armor, Angel Gabriel.

Alfred Godwin & Company designed the stained-and-leaded glass for the Bellevue-Stratford Hotel, at 200 South Broad Street, Philadelphia. This was the grandest hotel in the city, and hotelier George Boldt's brain-child and masterpiece. Many of Godwin windows were removed and sold during renovations in the 1940s and 1950s. Twelve of his original transoms survive along the building's Broad Street facade. Several of his sky-lights and one Venetian window also are extant. The second Venetian window (of a nymph dancing), which graced the former North/Main Staircase, disappeared during renovations in the 1980s. One of his sky-lights is located north of the lobby, in the Starbucks Coffee Shop on the Walnut Street side.

Godwin designed most of the stained-and-leaded glass for the Pennsylvania State Capitol in Harrisburg, Pennsylvania:

The Capitol's green and gold hemispheric opalescent glass dome in the Supreme Court Chamber was created by Alfred Godwin of Philadelphia. Godwin emigrated from England in 1874 where he had received his training in stained glass. In 1891 he ran an advertisement in the directory listing his shop address at 1325 Market Street, Philadelphia. He also produced windows for several churches including the former Presbyterian Church on Market Square in Philadelphia. It is surmised that Godwin also created the ochre stained glass windows in the rotunda's upper dome, the light court skylights, the light court lunette openings on the Capitol's fifth floor, and the decorative ceiling glass in the House and Senate galleries. All of the glasswork in these areas, along with the leaded glass skylights on the fourth floor are indicative of Godwin's style of work.

1886 business profile
Alfred Godwin & Co., Stained Glass, No 1201 Market Street.—The steady and growing demand for artistic productions in stained glass that has within recent years been so noticeable in the united States has imparted to this interesting branch of business an importance which at any period hitherto did not attach to it in this country. Among the foremost concerns engaged in this line in the city is the well-known and successful firm of Alfred Godwin & co., No. 1201 Market Street, than whom no one in the business in Philadelphia has been more fortunate in establishing and maintaining a reputation for a high standard of excellence in the work produced. All kinds of stained glass for churches and dwellings are turned out in the most excellent and artistic manner and designs that experience, skill and art can accomplish. Domestic work, in which line they are unsurpassed, is made a specialty. Designs and estimates are furnished on application, and everything is done to render the utmost satisfaction to patrons. The business was established in 1878 by Mr. Godwin, who conducted it alone up to 1883, when he admitted into partnership Mr. Wm. Reith, thus constituting the firm of Alfred Godwin & Co., who have since continued it with such eminent success. The trade, already exceedingly heavy, extends all over the United States and Mexico, and steadily increases. The premises occupied are spacious and commodious, comprising three floors, 25 x 125 feet in dimensions, where a fine line of examples of their work is open to public view. Mr. Godwin is a native of Manchester, England, and has resided in Philadelphia since 1870, and Mr. Reith was born in Munich, Bavaria, a city and a country that have contributed more to art and science, perhaps, than any in the world. Both are men of unmistakeable energy, enterprise and ability, and that they are masters of their art is amply attested by the positive and permanent success they have achieved.

Legacy
Godwin published at least three illustrated catalogues: Stained Glass, Alfred Godwin & Co., 1201 Market Street, Phila (1883-85); a circa-1891 catalogue; and Examples of Stained Glass Windows for Ecclesiastical and Domestic Purposes Recently Executed by Alfred Godwin (1895)

Among the artists employed by Alfred Godwin & Company were Thomas G. Aickin, William Willet, R. Appleby Miller, Frederick Wilson and Horace Rudy.

The Athenaeum of Philadelphia holds a collection of Godwin's sketches.

Selected works

18 windows, "Clayton" (Henry Clay Frick residence), Homewood, Pittsburgh, Pennsylvania
Love in the Tower Window (1883), now in Frick Art Museum
Harvest Window (1883)
Library Window (added 1892)
Angels Adoring the Eucharist (1886), lunette window over altar, Old St. Joseph's Church, Philadelphia, Pennsylvania
President Ulysses S. Grant Window (1886), Asbury Park Public Library, Asbury Park, New Jersey. Gift of George W. Childs.
Holy Infancy Roman Catholic Church (1886), Bethlehem, Pennsylvania
Market Square Presbyterian Church, Germantown, Philadelphia, Pennsylvania
The Sower, Toland Memorial Window, (1888)
Emily Jones Memorial Window (1888)
Amelia Jones Memorial Window (1888)
Fanshawe Memorial Window (1888)
Botton Memorial Window (1888)
17 additional windows attributed to Godwin
24 windows (1889), Mahoning Presbyterian Church, Danville, Pennsylvania
Beaver Memorial United Methodist Church, Lewisburg, Pennsylvania
Angel at the Tomb, Beaver Memorial Window (1890)
Christ and the Woman of Samaria, Wolfe Memorial Window (1890)
Christ at Bethany, Slifer Memorial Window (1890)
The Good Shepherd, Buckingham Memorial Window (1890)
9 additional windows attributed to Godwin
Trinity Lutheran Church, Norristown, Pennsylvania
Christ Teaching in the Temple (1895)
Recording Angel, Fisher Memorial Window (1895)
Virgin Mary, Longaker Memorial Window (1895)
The Good Shepherd, Baer Memorial Window (1895)
Christ and Mary Magdalene, March Memorial Window (1895)
Christ with the Children (1895)
Angel of the Resurrection (1895)
Martin Luther, Lehman Memorial Window (1895)
The Ascension (1895)
Madonna and Child, Geiger Memorial Window (1895)
A Comrade of the Cross, Stalher Memorial Window ( 1914) 
5 additional windows attributed to Godwin
Bellevue-Stratford Hotel, Philadelphia, Pennsylvania
12 transoms over first-floor Broad Street windows (1904)
2 Venetian windows (1904), one stolen in the 1980s
Skylights
All Saints' Episcopal Church, Norristown, Pennsylvania
Angels Playing Musical Instruments, Bolton/Adle Memorial Window (1905)
St. Matthew and St. Mark, Stroud Memorial Window (1905)
St. Luke and St. John, Stroud Memorial Window (1905)
Te Deum, Swift Window (1905)
The Annunciation, Burk Window (1908)
Pennsylvania State Capitol, Harrisburg, Pennsylvania
Supreme Court Chamber dome (1906)
Clerestory windows, Rotunda dome (1906, attributed)
Light Court skylights (1906, attributed)
Glass ceiling, Senate Chamber (1906, attributed)
Glass ceiling, House of Representatives Chamber (1906, attributed)
6 windows (1906), Memorial Chapel of the Resurrection, Mauch Chunk Cemetery, Jim Thorpe, Pennsylvania
5 windows (1908–11), St. Paul's Lutheran Church, Ardmore, Pennsylvania
The Battle of the Lilies and the Roses (1910), "Fairacres" (John W. Pepper residence), Jenkintown, Pennsylvania
Christ Resurrected, Fitler Memorial Window (1910), 5-panels above the altar, Episcopal Church of Christ, Riverton, New Jersey
St. Luke and the Epiphany Episcopal Church, Philadelphia, Pennsylvania
St. John, Brice Memorial Window (1912)
St. James, Lennon Memorial Window (1912)
St. Andrew, Lloyd Memorial Window (1912)
St. Peter, Belfield Memorial Window (1912)
St. Thomas, Paul Memorial Window (1912)
St. Matthew, Memorial Window (1912)
St. Bartholomew, Pepper Memorial Window (1912)
St. Thaddeus, Pepper Memorial Window (1912)
St. Simon, Clarkson Memorial Window (1912)
St. Philip, Van Bell Memorial Window (1912)
Neil Memorial Window (1916), Lady Chapel, St. Clement's Episcopal Church, Philadelphia, Pennsylvania

References

American stained glass artists and manufacturers
Artists from Philadelphia
1850 births
1934 deaths
British emigrants to the United States